Hassan and Nayima (translit. Hassan wa Nayima) is a 1959 Egyptian drama film directed by Henry Barakat. It was entered into the 9th Berlin International Film Festival.

Cast
 Muharram Fouad as Hassan
 Soad Hosny as Nayima
 Mohammed Tawfik
 Hassan el Baroudi
 Leila Fahmi
 Wedad Hamdy

References

External links

1959 films
1950s Arabic-language films
1959 drama films
Egyptian black-and-white films
Films directed by Henry Barakat
Egyptian drama films